Berkay Samancı (born 11 April 1989) is a Turkish professional footballer who plays as a defensive midfielder for TFF Second League club Kastamonuspor 1966. He was also a youth international, having been capped by the Turkey U-18 side twice in 2007.

Club career
Samancı began his career with local club Kocaelispor in 2000. He was promoted to the senior team in 2006, and made his debut on 12 May 2007 against Hacettepe. After making his debut, Samancı was called up to the Turkey U-18 team for two friendly matches against Israel. He made his debut on 28 May 2007. He was transferred to Bucaspor on 20 August 2009, helping the team to a second-place finish in the TFF First League and automatic promotion to the top-flight. Samancı was loaned to TFF Second League club Adana Demirspor for the second half of the 2010–11 season.

References

External links

1989 births
Sportspeople from İzmit
Living people
Turkish footballers
Turkey youth international footballers
Association football midfielders
Kocaelispor footballers
Bucaspor footballers
Adana Demirspor footballers
Altınordu F.K. players
Niğde Anadolu FK footballers
Manisaspor footballers
Menemenspor footballers
Utaş Uşakspor footballers
Süper Lig players
TFF First League players
TFF Second League players